Underland may refer to:

In fiction and literature
 Underland (Narnia), the name for all the land under the fictional world of Narnia in the 1953 book The Silver Chair by C. S. Lewis 
The Underland Chronicles, 2003–2007 series by Suzanne Collins
Alice in Underland, a short story by Henry Payson Dowst which led to the 1920 film Smiling All the Way
Unterland, a 1992 novel by Wolfgang Hohlbein
Alice in Underland, a 2000 non-fiction book by Wolfgang Zuckermann 
Underland, a 2019 non-fiction book by Robert Macfarlane
Underland, a 2002 "Victor Renquist" vampire novel by Mick Farren
Underland, a fictional realm from the Adult Swim series, The Venture Brothers
Underland, the proper name of the world visited by the title character in the 2010 film Alice In Wonderland

Other uses
Ulf Underland (1928–2012), Norwegian barrister
Underland Press, a publisher 
Underland is a dance work by Stephen Petronio based on the music of Nick Cave and The Bad Seeds, and premiered by the Sydney Dance Company at the Sydney Opera House May 2003
"Underland", a song by Sleeping People from their 2007 album Growing

See also
Underworld (disambiguation)
Underground (disambiguation)